Pima Community College (PCC) is a public community college in Pima County, Arizona.  It serves the Tucson metropolitan area with a community college district consisting of five campuses, four education centers, and several adult education learning centers. It provides traditional and online instruction for over 144 programs. The college also offers workforce training, non-credit personal interest classes and post-baccalaureate certificates. PCC is one of the largest multi-campus community colleges in the United States, with relative ranking varying between fourth and tenth largest. PCC is accredited by the Higher Learning Commission.

History 
Voters in Pima County approved the creation of a junior college district in 1966 and the first classes were held in 1969 at a temporary campus in an airplane hangar at the Tucson airport, Tucson Medical Center, Villa Maria, and Marana. The college was originally named Pima College but the name was changed to Pima Community College in 1972 to better reflect the mission of the college.

In 2008, PCC's Board of Governors began receiving anonymous complaints of sexual harassment by PCC chancellor Roy Flores. The board took no formal action until 2011 and Flores resigned in 2012 citing health problems. The search for his replacement has been troubled.  In February 2013, PCC discovered that the search consultant failed to disclose an issue with a finalist for the job; the consultant was fired and the job search extended.

One month after the chancellor search was extended, the interim chancellor resigned in the wake of a scathing report issued by PCC's regional accreditor the Higher Learning Commission (HLC). The report documented not only the ignored complaints of sexual harassment but also a hostile work environment and numerous administrative and financial problems. The report also discussed problems with admissions standards that PCC changed in 2011, problems the college has admitted. As a result of these problems Pima been on probation with the HLC; however, on Feb. 26, 2015 this probation was rescinded.  Although the probation was retracted, Pima continues to remain "On Notice" for deficiencies.

PCC also received media attention in early 2011 as the former school of 2011 Tucson Shooting perpetrator Jared Lee Loughner. While at PCC, some of his teachers complained to the administration about his disruptions and bizarre behavior, as they thought them a sign of mental illness and feared what he might do. The college decided to suspend Loughner.

Campuses and learning centers 
The original campus for Pima College was located at the site which is now the West Campus. Before the campus opened, classes were taught at a variety of locations around Tucson. From 1971 to the present, the college district has expanded to meet the growing educational needs of the Tucson area.  The campuses and learning center provides traditional classroom, distance learning, and hands-on learning opportunities. There are six campuses across the Tucson metropolitan area:
 Community campus (closed in 2019)
 Desert Vista campus
 Downtown campus
 East campus
 Northwest campus
 West campus

Additionally, there are four Learning/Education Centers:
 Davis Monthan Air Force Base Education Center
 Green Valley Community Learning Center
 Northeast Education Center (closed in 2011)
 Southeast Education Center

Community campus 
The Pima Community College Community campus was opened in 1975 to meet non-traditional educational needs, including distance learning, non-degree activity classes, and adult education. In 1997, the campus moved to Bonita Avenue and Commerce Park Loop, near St. Mary's Road and Interstate 10. The campus was home to the teacher education program. Many of its services were moved to the Northwest, West, and Downtown campuses when Community campus was closed in 2019.

Desert Vista campus 
First established as the South Education Center in 1986, the Desert Vista campus moved to its present location in 1993. The campus is located at Valencia Viejo, a site once occupied by the Hohokam people, between Irvington Road and Valencia Road on Calle Santa Cruz, west of Interstate 19. The campus supports the nearby Aviation Technology Center at Tucson International Airport and supplies workforce training to the business community at the Center for Training and Development.

Downtown campus 
Opened in 1974, Downtown Campus is situated between Speedway Blvd. and Drachman Street on Stone Avenue, close to downtown Tucson and east of Interstate 10.  It has traditional academic, occupational, technical, and trade programs. In 2018 the historic Tucson Inn was purchased by the district and added to the campus.

East campus 
Its programs include Veterinary Technology and Emergency Medical Technology.  

The College East Campus Observatory was established in 1989 by Professor David G. Iadevaia. It includes the Pima College – East Campus observatory and teaching planetarium. After many years in temporary, makeshift facilities, the observatory now has a new, permanent home which was designed by Professor Iadevaia. The observatory is an important part of astronomy education, not only for registered students but also for the public.

Northwest campus 
In 2003, the Northwest Community Learning Center (established in 1998) became the Northwest campus, the newest PCC campus. The  campus is located on Shannon Road, between Ina and Magee roads in north Tucson. The campus is home to the hotel/restaurant management and therapeutic massage programs.

West campus 
The campus was opened in 1970. Facilities located at West Campus include the Center for Archaeological Field Training, the Center for the Arts, and the offices of The Pima Post newspaper and Cababi literary magazine. The campus is home to the college's programs in health-related professions. West Campus is home to Sand Script, a student literary magazine.

Learning centers 

The learning centers provide administrative functions and teach classes. These centers are:
 Davis-Monthan Air Force Base Education Center, meeting the needs of active duty military at Davis-Monthan Air Force Base and members of the general public.
 Green Valley Community Learning Center, south of Tucson along Interstate 19, serving the Green Valley community.

Adult learning centers for basic education, ESOL instruction, citizenship classes, and GED preparation are located at the following locations:
 Eastside Learning Center on south Alvernon Way
 El Pueblo Liberty Learning Center on Irvington Road, east of Interstate 19
 El Rio Learning Center on west Speedway Blvd.
 Lindsey Center on south Third Ave.

Partnership with The Catholic University of America
In 2019, a partnership with The Catholic University of America was announced whereby students could earn an associate degree from Pima and a bachelor's degree in business management from Catholic University. The program is administered by Catholic's Metropolitan School of Professional Studies and taught by professors at Catholic University's Busch School of Business.

Under the program, first year students enter Pima and take a blend of courses from the two institutions, including foundational courses in philosophy and theology. Over the course of the program, two-thirds of courses will be taken remotely and one-third will be taken in dedicated space on the Pima campus.

Between 20 and 25 students will initially be admitted to the program, which has a total four year cost of $32,000, far less than the cost of in-state tuition at a four-year Arizona public college. At the time of launch, it was hoped to grow the program to include 100 students per cohort in three years. Financial aid is available through both institutions. Local businesses in Tucson are also fundraising to support the program.

Catholic University officials recognized that most Hispanics in the United States are Catholics but historically have not had access to Catholic higher education in their areas. An analysis by Catholic University found that of "the 25 U.S. cities with the largest total increases in the Hispanic population, nine have no Catholic college or university in close proximity." Given this, in 2017, Catholic University began exploring partnerships with existing institutions in the Southwest instead of opening up a new campus. Several cities with large populations of Hispanics and Catholics were considered when then-Tucson Mayor Jonathan Rothschild heard of Catholic University's desire to open a satellite campus. He called the University's provost and then connected the provost with the bishop and over 300 local business leaders and other members of the community.

The two colleges worked with local business leaders and with Education Design Lab and Extension Engine to develop the curriculum for the program. Local business leaders will also serve as adjunct professors.  The program is targeted at first generation Americans and other under-represented socio-economic groups.

Organization and administration 
PCC is governed by a five-member Board of Governors, whose members serve six-year elected terms.  Board members are elected based on County electoral district.

Governance and leadership

The Governing Board of the Pima County Community College District has five members elected by the voters from geographical districts within the Pima County. The Chancellor of PCC serves as its chief executive officer with each campus led by a president and each administrative area run by a vice chancellor.

Academics 
PCC offers many community-related programs to support the needs of the Tucson metropolitan area.  It provides GED and adult literacy classes, art and theater, senior facilities, and summer camps.  PCC also has an extensive small-business development center.

PCC is accredited by the Higher Learning Commission of the North Central Association of Colleges and Schools.  Additionally, many medical programs (such as nursing or veterinary technology) have additional specialized accreditation by the Arizona and United States Departments of Education.  PCC's Aviation Technology Program, through Davis-Monthan Air Force Base, is approved by the Federal Aviation Administration.

Pima Community College also hosted the Aztec Middle College, a program operated by the Tucson Unified School District; it offers credit recovery and concurrent earning of high school and college credits to older students on four Pima College campuses.

Degrees and certificates 

PCC awards the following degrees:
 Associate of Arts (AA)
 Associate of Business (AB)
 Associate of Science (AS)
 Associate of Fine Arts (AFA)
 Associate of Applied Arts (AAA)
 Associate of General Studies (AGS)

It also awards certificates in many disciplines.

AGEC 
In 1999, Arizona approved the Arizona General Education Curriculum (AGEC) for students transferring from an Arizona community college to one of the three state universities.  A 35-credit block of general education courses, the AGEC transfers to the state universities (and some other baccalaureate degree granting institutions) to meet their lower division general education requirements.  PCC awards the AGEC-A, AGEC-B, and AGEC-S certificates.

Student life

Student publications 

 Pima Post, the student-run online news service. The newspaper has been named a national finalist by the Society of Professional Journalists for best all-around two-year college newspaper.
 SandScript, a literary magazine.  This publication has won the Best Overall Publication, Southwest Division, from the Community College Humanities Association, most recently in 2013.

Pima Post 
The Pima Post is the student newspaper at Pima Community College. It was created in the 1970s as the Campus News (1973 to 1977), then named the Aztec Campus News (1977–1978), the Aztec News (1978–1981), the Aztec Press (1982–2021) before becoming the Pima Post in 2021. Valerie Vineyard is the current adviser and Joshua Manis is the current business manager.

The Pima Post publishes online. The Pima Post covers all six campuses of Pima Community College with their news service. Print circulation was 5,000 copies of bi-weekly editions until 2020 when the publication moved to online-only media distribution.

Other programs 
 Army ROTC
 Performing arts (theater, music, and art)
 Student government
 Honors program
 Phi Theta Kappa honors society

Athletics 

PCC sponsors fifteen intercollegiate sports teams for men and women. Pima's teams are nicknamed the Aztecs.

Fall Sports 
 Men's Cross Country
 Women's Cross Country
 Men's Soccer
 Women's Soccer
 Women's Volleyball

Winter Sports 
 Men's Basketball
 Women's Basketball

Spring Sports 
 Baseball
 Men's Golf
 Women's Golf
 Softball
 Men's Tennis
 Women's Tennis
 Men's Track and Field
 Women's Track and Field

Noted people 
 Warren Faidley, storm chaser
 Jared Lee Loughner, perpetrator of the 2011 Tucson shooting (did not graduate)
 Ned Norris Jr., former Chairman of the Tohono O'odham Nation

Athletes 
 Abdi Abdirahman, Olympic long-distance runner
 D. J. Carrasco, professional baseball pitcher
 Erubiel Durazo, professional baseball player
 Horacio Llamas, professional basketball player
 Shakir Smith, professional basketball player
 Donald Toia, professional soccer player (MLS)
 Minh Vu, professional soccer player (USL)

Mixed martial artists 
 Seth Baczynski, professional mixed martial artist, 10x veteran of the UFC, and contestant for The Ultimate Fighter 11 as well as The Ultimate Fighter 25.
 Anthony Birchak, professional mixed martial artist, 4x veteran of the UFC, and current color commentator for Rizin Fighting Federation.
 Dominick Cruz, professional mixed martial artist, 7x veteran of the UFC, and the former 2x UFC bantamweight champion, as well as the final WEC bantamweight champion.
 Efrain Escudero, NJCAA All-American wrestler; professional mixed martial artist, winner of The Ultimate Fighter 8, and 12x veteran of the UFC.
 Drew Fickett, professional mixed martial artist, and 7x veteran of the UFC.
 Jesse Forbes, NJCAA All-American wrestler; mixed martial artist, contestant on The Ultimate Fighter 2, and 3x veteran of the UFC.
 Chad Griggs, professional mixed martial artist, and 2x veteran of the UFC.
 Rich Hale, professional mixed martial artist, and two time Bellator MMA tournament runner-up.
 Danny Martinez, professional mixed martial artist, and 4x veteran of the UFC.
 George Roop, professional mixed martial artist, contestant for The Ultimate Fighter 8, and 13x veteran of the UFC.
 James Terry, professional mixed martial artist, Strikeforce & Bellator MMA veteran.
 Jamie Varner, NJCAA All-American wrestler; retired professional mixed martial artist, 10x veteran of the UFC, and former WEC Lightweight Champion.
 Ed West, professional mixed martial artist, and Bellator MMA veteran.

References

External links 

 Official website
 Pima Post, college newspaper
 Pima Aztecs, athletics

 
Community colleges in Arizona
Educational institutions established in 1969
Universities and colleges in Tucson, Arizona
1969 establishments in Arizona
NJCAA athletics